Margarites is a genus of sea snails, marine gastropod mollusks in the family Margaritidae.

This genus belonged previously to the subfamily Margaritinae in the family Turbinidae.

Description
This genus consists of small species of variable size between 3 mm and 15 mm. The Alaskan specimens of Margarites costalis reach almost 25 mm in diameter.
Their flat shell has a turbiniform shape with convex whorls and a typical iridescent lustre.

Species
Species within the genus Margarites include:

 Margarites albolineatus (E. A. Smith, 1899)
 Margarites angulatus Galkin, 1955
 Margarites argentatus (Gould, 1841)
 Margarites atlantoides (Quinn, 1992)
 Margarites avachensis Galkin, 1955 [ex Bartsch MS]
 Margarites avenosooki MacGinitie, 1959 
 Margarites bairdii (Dall, 1889)
 Margarites biconica Numanami, 1996
 Margarites bisikovi Egorov, 2000
 Margarites cabernet Egorov, 2000
 Margarites calliostomoides Egorov, 2000
 Margarites costalis (Gould, 1841)
 Margarites crebrilirulata (Smith, 1907)
 Margarites dnopherus (Watson, 1879)
 Margarites ecarinatus (Dall, 1919)
 Margarites giganteus (Leche, 1878)
 Margarites glabrus Golikov & Gulbin, 1978
 Margarites groenlandicus (Gmelin, 1791)
 Margarites gunnerusensis Numanami, 1996
 Margarites helicinus (Phipps, 1774)
 Margarites hickmanae J. H. McLean, 1984
 Margarites huloti Vilvens & Sellanes, 2006
 Margarites imperialis Simone & Birman, 2006
 Margarites keepi Smith & Gordon, 1948
 Margarites kophameli (Strebel, 1905)
 Margarites koreanicus (Dall, 1919)
 Margarites laminarum (Jeffreys, 1883)
 Margarites miona Dall, 1927
 Margarites mirabilis Simone & Birman, 2006
 Margarites olivaceus (Brown, 1827)
 Margarites picturatus Golikov, in Golikov & Scarlato, 1967
 Margarites pilsbryi Kuroda & Habe, 1952
 Margarites pribiloffensis (Dall, 1919)
 Margarites pupillus (Gould, 1849)
 Margarites refulgens (Smith, 1907)
 Margarites rossicus Dall, 1919
 Margarites ryukyuensis Okutani, Sasaki & Tsuchida, 2000
 Margarites salmoneus (Carpenter, 1864)
 Margarites schantaricus (Middendorff, 1849)
 Margarites scintillans (Watson, 1879)
 Margarites shinkai Okutani, Tsuchida & Fujikura, 1992
 Margarites simbla Dall, 1913
 Margarites smithi Bartsch, 1927
 Margarites sordidus (Hancock, 1846)
 Margarites striatus (Leach, 1841)
 Margarites toroides Hoffman, van Heugten & Lavaleye, 2011
 Margarites vahlii (Møller, 1842)
 Margarites vityazi Egorov, 2000
 Margarites vorticiferus (Dall, 1873)

Species brought into synonymy
 Margarites acuticostatus Carpenter, 1864: synonym of Parviturbo acuticostatus (Carpenter, 1864) 
 Margarites alabastrum "Beck, H.H. MS" Lovén, S.L., 1846: synonym of Calliostoma occidentale (Mighels, J.W. & C.B. Adams, 1842)
 Margarites albula Gould, A.A., 1861: synonym of Solariella obscura (Couthouy, J.P., 1838)
 Margarites beringensis (E. A. Smith, 1899): synonym of Margarites helicinus (Phipps, 1774)
 Margarites biangulosus (A. Adams, 1854): synonym of Minolia biangulosa (A. Adams, 1854)
 Margarites cinereus Filatova, Z.A. & B.I. Zatsepin, 1948: synonym of Margarites costalis (Gould, 1841) 
 Margarites clausus Golikov & Gulbin, 1978 : synonym of Cantharidoscops clausus (Golikov & Gulbin, 1978) 
 Margarites diaphanus Gray, 1847: synonym of Margarites helicinus (Phipps, 1774)
 Margarites dnopherus Rios, 1994 (non Watson, 1879): synonym of Margarites mirabilis Simone & Birman, 2006
 Margarites dulcis E. A. Smith, 1907: synonym of Antimargarita dulcis (E. A. Smith, 1907) 
 Margarites elevatus Dall, 1919: synonym of Margarites helicinus (Phipps, 1774)
 Margarites erythrocoma Dall, 1889: synonym of Pseudostomatella erythrocoma (Dall, 1889) 
 Margarites euspira (Dall, 1881): synonym of Bathymophila euspira (Dall, 1881)
 Margarites excavatus Dall, 1919: synonym of Margarites helicinus (Phipps, 1774) 
 Margarites expansa Sowerby I, 1838: synonym of Margarella expansa (Sowerby I, 1838) 
 Margarites frigidus Dall, 1919: synonym of Cantharidoscops frigidus (Dall, 1919)
 Margarites gemma E.A. Smith, 1915: synonym of Falsimargarita gemma (E.A. Smith, 1915)
 Margarites glauca Möller, H.P.C., 1842: synonym of Margarites olivaceus (Brown, 1827) 
 Margarites grosvenori Dall, 1926: synonym of Margarites olivaceus (Brown, 1827) 
 Margarites hypolispus Dall, 1919: synonym of Margarites vahlii (Møller, 1842)
 Margarites impervia Strebel, 1908: synonym of Lissotesta impervia (Strebel, 1908) 
 Margarites johnsoni Dall, W.H., 1921: synonym of Margarites vahlii (Møller, 1842) 
 Margarites kamchaticus Dall, 1919: synonym of Margarites schantaricus (Middendorff, 1849)
 Margarites kurilensis Golikov & Gulbin, 1978: synonym of Margarites groenlandicus kurilensis Golikov & Gulbin, 1978
 Margarites margaritiferus Okutani, 1964: synonym of Solariella margaritifera (Okutani, 1964)
 Margarites marginatus Dall, 1919: synonym of Margarites olivaceus marginatus Dall, 1919
 Margarites mighelsi Rehder, H.A., 1937: synonym of Margarites vahlii (Møller, 1842) 
 Margarites minima Seguenza, 1876: synonym of Lissotesta minima (Seguenza, 1876)
 Margarites ochotensis (Philippi, 1846): synonym of Margarites schantaricus (Middendorff, 1849)
 Margarites pauperculus Dall, 1919: synonym of Solariella varicosa (Mighels & Adams, 1842)
 Margarites pruinosa Rochebrune & Mabille, 1885: synonym of Margarella pruinosa (Rochebrune & Mabille, 1885) 
 Margarites regalis Verrill & Smith, 1880: synonym of Calliotropis regalis (Verrill & Smith, 1880) 
 Margarites rudis Dall, 1919: synonym of Margarites costalis (Gould, 1841) 
 Margarites shannonicus Dall, 1919: synonym of Margarites striatus (Leach, 1841)
 Margarites striata striata Galkin, Y.I., 1955: synonym of Margarites costalis (Gould, 1841) 
 Margarites umbilicalis Broderip & Sowerby, 1829: synonym of Margarites groenlandicus umbilicalis Broderip & Sowerby, 1829
 Margarites undulatus (G.B. Sowerby, I, 1838): synonym of Margarites groenlandicus (Gmelin, 1791)
 Margarites violacea King & Broderip, 1832: synonym of Margarella violacea (King & Broderip, 1832) 
 Margarites vorticifer (Dall, 1873): synonym of Margarites vorticiferus (Dall, 1873)
 Margarites wacei Melvill & Standen, 1918: synonym of Margarella wacei (Melvill & Standen, 1918) 
 Nomina dubia 
 Margarites multilineatus DeKay, 1843 
 Margarites ornatus (De Kay, 1843)
 Margarites sigaretinus (Sowerby I, 1838)

References

 Vaught, K.C. (1989). A classification of the living Mollusca. American Malacologists: Melbourne, FL (USA). . XII, 195 pp.
 Gofas, S.; Le Renard, J.; Bouchet, P. (2001). Mollusca, in: Costello, M.J. et al. (Ed.) (2001). European register of marine species: a check-list of the marine species in Europe and a bibliography of guides to their identification. Collection Patrimoines Naturels, 50: pp. 180–213
 Spencer, H.; Marshall. B. (2009). All Mollusca except Opisthobranchia. In: Gordon, D. (Ed.) (2009). New Zealand Inventory of Biodiversity. Volume One: Kingdom Animalia. 584 pp

External links

 
Margaritidae
Gastropod genera